Bonavista can refer to:

Geography
Cape Bonavista, a headland in Newfoundland, Canada
Bonavista Peninsula, a peninsula on the island of Newfoundland, Canada
Bonavista Bay, a bay of the island of Newfoundland, Canada

Places

Australia 

Bonavista, Queensland, a town in the Whitsunday Region, Australia

Canada 

Bonavista, Newfoundland and Labrador, a town in Newfoundland, Canada
Lake Bonavista, Calgary, a neighbourhood in Calgary, Alberta, Canada

Spain 

Bonavista (El Pla del Penedès), village in El Pla del Penedès, Barcelona (province), Catalonia, Spain.
Bonavista (Tarragona), neighborhood of Tarragona, Spain.

Electoral districts
Bonavista—Gander—Grand Falls—Windsor, a federal electoral district in Newfoundland and Labrador, Canada
Bonavista—Twillingate, a federal electoral district in Newfoundland and Labrador, Canada
Bonavista—Trinity—Conception, former federal electoral district in Newfoundland and Labrador, Canada
Bonavista South, a provincial electoral district of Newfoundland and Labrador, Canada
Bonavista North, a provincial electoral district of Newfoundland and Labrador, Canada

Ships
 - a number of ships with this name

See also
Boa Vista (disambiguation)
Buenavista (disambiguation)
Buena Vista (disambiguation)
Buona Vista (disambiguation)